Michael Terrance Cameron (born January 8, 1973) is an American former professional Major League Baseball outfielder. He played for the Chicago White Sox, Cincinnati Reds, Seattle Mariners, New York Mets, San Diego Padres, Milwaukee Brewers, Boston Red Sox, and Florida Marlins over a 16 year career and is currently the Special Assignment Coach for the Seattle Mariners.

In 2002, Cameron became the 13th player to hit four home runs in one game. He was also an All-Star in 2001 and won Gold Gloves in 2001, 2003, and 2006. Mike Cameron has distinguished himself by being only one of 22 players in the history of baseball to have at least 250 home runs and 250 stolen bases and became the 20th member of this exclusive 250/250 club. Cameron is also the only MLB player to hit 2 home runs in the same game with 8 separate teams.

Early life
Cameron was born in La Grange, Georgia and raised on Render Street by his grandmother; he moved into her house when he was seven years old to keep her company after her husband died. Cameron attended LaGrange High School. His grandmother kept him from playing baseball as a high school junior because he failed a chemistry class. As a result, he drew less attention from scouts.

Playing career

Chicago White Sox
Cameron was drafted out of high school in the 18th round by the Chicago White Sox in 1991. His major league debut took place on August 27, with the Chicago White Sox. In  he won a starting job as the team's regular center fielder.

Cincinnati Reds

Seattle Mariners
Along with three other players he was traded to the Seattle Mariners for Ken Griffey Jr. before the  season.

Cameron tied a major league record on May 2, 2002 when he hit four home runs in one game  becoming only the 15th player in MLB history to do this. In his fifth at bat, he hit one to the warning track, just missing what would have been a record-setting fifth home run.
He led all major league center fielders in range factor (3.42) in 2003.

New York Mets
On December 23, 2003, Cameron signed a three-year, $19.5 million contract to play center field for the New York Mets. In his first season with the Mets, Cameron hit a career-high 30 home runs. With the acquisition by the Mets of Carlos Beltrán before the 2005 season, Cameron surrendered his position to the star center fielder and played most of his games in right field during the 2005 season. On August 11, 2005, in San Diego, Cameron collided with Beltran in the outfield as both made diving attempts to catch a fly ball. Cameron suffered a concussion and multiple fractures of his nose and cheekbones, and was removed from the field on a stretcher. Beltran also suffered a concussion but was able to walk off the field with help.

San Diego Padres

On November 15,  Cameron was traded to the San Diego Padres for Xavier Nady. He won his first National League Gold Glove award during the  season with San Diego.

After leaving the Seattle Mariners in 2004 via free agency, Cameron played his first game back in Seattle during inter-league play in May 2006. Mariners fans greeted his return with a standing ovation.

On October 31, 2007, it was announced that he had failed a test for banned stimulants for a second time and would miss the first 25 games of the 2008 season. Cameron has said he believes that a supplement he took was "tainted." However, given the requirement of two failed drug tests before an announcement is made, this explanation is questionable. He was just the second major leaguer to be suspended for a second positive test for stimulants, following Neifi Pérez.

Milwaukee Brewers

On January 14,  he signed a 1-year contract with the Milwaukee Brewers.

On March 13, 2008, Cameron applied for a therapeutic exemption to use stimulants during the 2008 season because of his outfield collision with former teammate Carlos Beltrán. He claimed to be struggling with after-effects of the collision that ended his 2005 season.  If he had applied for the exemption in 2007, he could have avoided the 25-game suspension he had to serve to begin this season for testing positive for a banned stimulant for the second time. He also told USA Today that he will see a neurologist to determine if he is suffering from post-concussion syndrome.  If the exemption is granted, Cameron would be permitted to use some amphetamines that are currently banned by the Major League Baseball drug policy.

In November 2008, his club option was picked up by the Brewers for the 2009 season.

On May 24, 2009, Cameron hit his 250th career home run against the Minnesota Twins, becoming the 20th player in the league to hit 250 home runs and steal 250 bases.

Boston Red Sox
On December 16, 2009, Cameron signed a 2-year deal with the Boston Red Sox. He missed most of the season with a groin injury but managed to still hit 4 home runs on the season.

Cameron made 70 plate appearances for Boston, batting .143, before being designated for assignment on June 29.

Florida Marlins
On July 5, he was traded to the Florida Marlins for a player to be named later or cash considerations. He was released on September 13, 2011.

Washington Nationals and Retirement with Mariners
On December 19, 2011, he agreed to a minor league deal with the Washington Nationals.

Cameron never played in any games for the Nationals and announced his retirement on February 19, 2012. He signed a one-day contract with Seattle on April 14, 2012, to officially retire as a Mariner before throwing out the ceremonial first pitch at the Mariners' home opener that same day.

Personal life
Together with Greg Brown and Robin Roberts, Cameron wrote a book (aimed primarily at children) titled "It Takes a Team: Mike Cameron", where he presents his views on the importance of teamwork and describes his life. It was published in 2002 by Triumph Books.

After being selected to the American League All-Star Team in 2001, Cameron used his salary bonus to purchase All-Star Game warm-up jackets for all of his Seattle Mariner teammates. He is known for routinely sitting on top of the dugout to sign autographs and talk with fans before games. He is also the founder of the Cam4Kids Foundation and was host of the First State Golf Tournament for Inner City Kids in Seattle in 2002; these in effort to raise money to provide scholarships to inner-city youth.  He is actively involved with the Make-A-Wish Foundation as well as the Starlight Foundation.

Cameron married his former high school classmate, JaBreka, in or around 1999. As of 2002, they had three children, sons named Dazmon and Mehki and a daughter named T'aja. Cameron's son, Daz Cameron, played baseball at Eagle's Landing Christian Academy. He was drafted 37th overall by the Houston Astros in the 2015 MLB draft. Daz is currently an outfielder for the Detroit Tigers' organization. On April 26th. 2019, Mike returned to the Seattle Mariners as a Special Assignment Coach.

See also 

 List of Major League Baseball career home run leaders
 List of Major League Baseball career stolen bases leaders
 List of Major League Baseball single-game home run leaders
 List of second-generation Major League Baseball players
 List of sportspeople sanctioned for doping offences

References

External links

1973 births
Living people
African-American baseball players
Baseball players from Georgia (U.S. state)
People from LaGrange, Georgia
Chicago White Sox players
Cincinnati Reds players
Seattle Mariners players
New York Mets players
San Diego Padres players
Milwaukee Brewers players
Boston Red Sox players
Florida Marlins players
American League All-Stars
American sportspeople in doping cases
Gold Glove Award winners
Major League Baseball center fielders
Major League Baseball players suspended for drug offenses
Gulf Coast White Sox players
South Bend White Sox players
Utica Blue Sox players
Prince William Cannons players
Birmingham Barons players
Nashville Sounds players
Norfolk Tides players
St. Lucie Mets players
Lake Elsinore Storm players
Pawtucket Red Sox players
Portland Sea Dogs players
21st-century African-American sportspeople
20th-century African-American sportspeople